The 2006–07 Columbus Blue Jackets season was the seventh National Hockey League season in Columbus, Ohio.

The off-season was dominated by a contract dispute with top forward Nikolay Zherdev, who had threatened to return to Russia to play if Columbus did not meet his demands. Zherdev remained a holdout for much of the preseason. However, the two parties were able to come to an agreement approximately a week before the season began.

The Blue Jackets, hoping to qualify for the playoffs for the first time in franchise history, got off to a disastrous start, falling as low as 6–16–2 into December, briefly holding the worst record in the NHL. The Jackets' poor start led General Manager Doug MacLean to fire Head Coach Gerard Gallant on November 13. Gallant would be replaced a week later by veteran coach Ken Hitchcock. Coincidentally, Hitchcock's first game as Jackets head coach was against the Philadelphia Flyers, the team that fired him as head coach earlier in the season.

The Blue Jackets once again failed to qualify for the postseason. As the Atlanta Thrashers qualified for the playoffs in the East, the Blue Jackets were, until the 2008–09 season, the only NHL team to have never played a post-season game.

Regular season
The Blue Jackets were shut out a League-high 16 times during the regular season. Along with the four shutouts Blue Jackets goaltenders recorded, 20 of the Blue Jackets' 82 regular-season games ended in a shutout. They were also the most penalized team in the League, with 453 power-play opportunities against.

Season standings

Final regular season standings for the 2006–07 NHL season

Schedule and results

October

November

December

January

February

March

April

Green background indicates win. 
Red background indicates regulation loss. 
White background indicates overtime/shootout loss.

Playoffs
The Blue Jackets failed to qualify for the playoffs for the sixth consecutive season.

Player stats

Regular season
Scoring

Goaltending

Transactions
The Blue Jackets have been involved in the following transactions during the 2006–07 season.

Trades

Free agents acquired

Free agents lost

Claimed off waivers

Draft picks
Columbus' picks at the 2006 NHL Entry Draft in Vancouver, British Columbia.  The Blue Jackets picked 6th overall.

Farm teams

Syracuse Crunch
The Syracuse Crunch are the Blue Jackets American Hockey League affiliate for the seventh season.  Prior to the start of the 2006–07 season, the two clubs announced they had agreed to extend the affiliation agreement for four more years.

Dayton Bombers
The Dayton Bombers of the ECHL are also entering their seventh season as an affiliate of the Blue Jackets.

Youngstown SteelHounds
The Jackets are also affiliated with the Youngstown SteelHounds of the Central Hockey League.

See also
2006–07 NHL season

References

External links

Player stats: Columbus Blue Jackets player stats on espn.com
Game log: Columbus Blue Jackets game log on espn.com
Team standings: NHL standings on espn.com

Columbus Blue Jackets seasons
Columbus Blue Jackets season
Colum
Blue
Blue